Gracias por Esperar (Thanks For Waiting) is the twenty-first studio album by Mexican recording artist Juan Gabriel, released on June 28, 1994, eight years after his previous studio album in 1986. This extraordinarily long period of time between Juan Gabriel's prolific releases was due to a copyright dispute with his publisher BMG Music Publishing. The album was nominated for a Lo Nuestro Award for Pop Album of the Year and a Grammy Award for Best Latin Pop Album. losing both to Luis Miguel's Segundo Romance. Gabriel released four singles from the album, "Pero Que Necesidad", "Lentamente", "Vienes o Voy", and "Muriendo de Amor", with the first peaking at number-one at the Billboard Latin Songs chart.

Track listing

Album certification

References 

Juan Gabriel albums
Mexican pop albums
Latin Grammy Award for Best Male Pop Vocal Album
1994 albums